Willem Sterrenberg Jacobus Marais Bouwer (born 4 September 1985) is a South African rugby union footballer. He plays mostly as a flanker. He most recently represented the Pumas in the Currie Cup and Vodacom Cup having previously played for the Leopards.

In 2013, he was included in a South Africa President's XV team that played in the 2013 IRB Tbilisi Cup and won the tournament after winning all three matches.

He was a member of the Pumas side that won the Vodacom Cup for the first time in 2015, beating  24–7 in the final. Bouwer made three appearances during the season, scoring one try.

References

External links

itsrugby.co.uk profile

Living people
1985 births
South African rugby union players
Rugby union flankers
Pumas (Currie Cup) players
Leopards (rugby union) players
People from Kempton Park, Gauteng
Rugby union players from Gauteng